This is a list of science fiction and science fiction-related magazines. The primary focus of the magazines in this list is or was writing about science fiction and/or contained science fiction for at least part of their run.

Science fiction